MUB may refer to:
 Maun Airport, Botswana, from its IATA airport code
 Medical University of Bahrain
 Memorial Union Building (disambiguation), any one of several buildings
 Musselburgh railway station, Scotland, from its National Rail code
 Mutually unbiased bases, a measurement concept in quantum information theory
 Bethnahrin National Council, a left wing Assyrian nationalist organization in the Middle East